Gold Was Our Grave is a 1954 mystery detective novel by the British writer Henry Wade. It was the seventh and last in a series of novels featuring the character of Inspector Poole, published during the Golden Age of Detective Fiction.

Synopsis
After Hector Berrenton narrowly survives a car accident, he returns home to find a threatening note. It seems likely that someone has tampered with his car, seeking revenge for his involvement in a Bolivian goldmining concern that left many investors ruined several years earlier.

References

Bibliography
 Bargainnier, Earl F. & Dove George N. Cops and Constables: American and British Fictional Policemen. Popular Press, 1986.
 Herbert, Rosemary. Whodunit?: A Who's Who in Crime & Mystery Writing. Oxford University Press, 2003.
 Reilly, John M. Twentieth Century Crime & Mystery Writers. Springer, 2015.

1954 British novels
Novels by Henry Wade
British mystery novels
British crime novels
British detective novels
Constable & Co. books
Novels set in Sussex
Novels set in London